People who served as the mayor of the Municipality of Balmain are:

References

Mayors Balmain
Balmain, Mayors
Mayors of Balmain